Chuneh Khanlu (also Romanized as Chūneh Khānlū; also known as Chūnā Khānlū and Chūn Khān) is a village in Ojarud-e Shomali Rural District, in the Central District of Germi County, Ardabil Province, Iran. At the 2006 census, its population was 216 spread over 43 families.

References 

Towns and villages in Germi County